Whitton is an unincorporated community in Mississippi County, Arkansas, United States. The community is on Arkansas Highway 118 and Cross Bayou flows past to the north.

Notes

Unincorporated communities in Mississippi County, Arkansas
Unincorporated communities in Arkansas